Eriospermum zeyheri is a species of geophytic plant of the genus Eriospermum, indigenous to South Africa.

Description
The leaf is a rounded heart-shape, and is prostrate, held flat against the ground. Several related species, such as Eriospermum capense, Eriospermum breviscapum and Eriospermum pubescens, have a similar heart-shaped leaf. 
However, the leaf of E.zeyheri is generally a lighter green above, and not a reddish colour below. It is also always pressed flat against the ground.

The irregular-shaped tuber of E.zeyheri is white-ish inside.

The pale, greenish-cream-coloured, fragrant, star-shaped flowers appear on a tall, thin inflorescence in December to March.

Distribution
This species occurs in renosterveld vegetation, in clay soils, across the southern Cape, South Africa, extending from McGregor as far east as the town of Grahamstown.

References

zeyheri
Renosterveld